The Sino-Spanish University Alliance (SSU) is a consortium of 16 leading universities in China and Spain. SSU was initiated by Beijing Institute of Technology and Technical University of Madrid and was formally founded on 14 June 2009 in Beijing. SSU aims to establish the communication and cooperation between universities in China and Spain, and to promote scientific collaboration, student exchange and talent development.

Members

Beijing Institute of Technology
 Beijing Jiaotong University
 Beihang University
 Beijing University of Chemical Technology
 Beijing University of Technology
 Harbin Institute of Technology
 North China Electric Power University
 Northwestern Polytechnical University
 Nanjing University of Aeronautics and Astronautics
 Nanjing University of Science and Technology
 University of Science and Technology Beijing

Technical University of Madrid
 Technical University of Valencia
 Polytechnic University of Catalonia
 University of Barcelona
 Autonomous University of Madrid

References 

Universities and colleges in China
Universities and colleges in Spain